Victor R. Steeh (May 8, 1923August 8, 2007) was a Michigan politician.

Early life and education
Victor was born on May 8, 1923 in Michigan to parents Caram and Dora Steeh. Victor attended Castle Heights Military Academy, Eastern Michigan University, and Western Michigan University. Victor earned a B.S. in business administration from Wayne State University.

Military career
Steeh served in the United States Army Air Corps during World War II.

Career
Steeh was an insurance salesman. On November 4, 1964, Steeh was elected to the Michigan House of Representatives where he represented the 75th district from January 13, 1965 to December 31, 1966. On November 8, 1966, Steeh was defeated in his attempt for re-election by James S. Nunneley. Steeh would run for this seat in the state house five more times, in the years 1967, 1970, 1972, 1976, and 1982.

Personal life
Victor lived in Mount Clemens, Michigan. Victor was married to Elsie M. Steeh. Together, they had two children. He was the brother of fellow state legislator, George C. Steeh. Victor was a member of AMVETS and the Disabled American Veterans. Victor was Episcopalian.

Death
Steeh died on August 8, 2007 in Michigan. He was interred in Clinton Grove Cemetery.

References

1923 births
2007 deaths
Burials in Michigan
Eastern Michigan University alumni
Episcopalians from Michigan
People from Mount Clemens, Michigan
Democratic Party members of the Michigan House of Representatives
Military personnel from Michigan
United States Army personnel of World War II
Wayne State University alumni
Western Michigan University alumni
20th-century American Episcopalians
20th-century American politicians
21st-century American Episcopalians